Suhail Saber (born 1 June 1962) is a former Iraqi football goalkeeper. He competed in the 1986 Asian Games. Saber played for Iraq between 1985 and 1990.

References

Living people
Iraqi footballers
Iraq international footballers
Footballers at the 1986 Asian Games
Place of birth missing (living people)
1962 births
Association football goalkeepers
Asian Games competitors for Iraq